Norwalk is a city located in southwestern Connecticut, United States, in southern Fairfield County, on the northern shore of Long Island Sound. Norwalk lies within both the New York metropolitan area and the Bridgeport metropolitan area.

Norwalk was originally settled in 1649, and is the sixth-most populous city in Connecticut. According to the 2020 United States Census, it has a population of 91,184.

History

Roger Ludlow purchased the areas east of the Norwalk River from Chief Mahackemo of the Norwaake (or Naramauke) Indians in 1640. Norwalk was settled in 1649, incorporated September 1651, and named after the Algonquin word , meaning "point of land", or more probably from the Native American name "Naramauke".

The Battle of Norwalk took place during the Revolutionary War, and led to the burning of most of the town. In 1836, the borough of Norwalk was created, covering the central area of the town. In 1853, the first ever train disaster in the United States happened over the Norwalk River. During the 19th and early 20th century, Norwalk was a major railroad stop for the New York, New Haven, and Hartford Railroad. The city of South Norwalk and the remaining parts of the town of Norwalk were both combined in 1910 to form the current city.

The Ku Klux Klan had a brief presence in Norwalk during the 1920s, but quickly fell apart due to internal issues. In 1955, multiple hurricanes hit the city, causing flooding in Norwalk Harbor. During the 1970s, efforts were taken to historically preserve South Norwalk, resulting in the creation of the Washington Street Historic District.

Geography

Climate

Topography
Norwalk's topography is dominated by its coastline along Long Island Sound, the Norwalk River and its eastern and western banks, and the Norwalk Islands.

Demographics

As of the census of 2010,  85,603 people, 35,415 households, and 21,630 families resided in the city. The racial makeup of the city was 68.7% White, 14.2% African American, 0.4% Native American, 4.8% Asian,  9.1% from other races, and 2.8% from two or more races. Hispanics or Latinos of any race were 24.3% of the population.

Of the 35,415 households, 27.9% had children under 18 living with them, 47.1% were married couples living together, 11.0% had a female householder with no husband present, and 38.4% were not families. About 33.0% of all households were made up of individuals, and 8.5% had someone living alone who was 65  or older. The average household size in the city was 2.55, and the average family size was 3.16.

The age distribution was 22% under 18, with 7.3% from 18 to 24, 31.7% from 25 to 44, 31.2% from 45 to 64, and 12.8% were 65 or older. The median age was 40 years. For every 100 females, there were 96.2 males.

The median income for a household in the city was $76,161, and for a family was $103,032. The per capita income for the city was $43,303. About 5.7% of families and 8.4% of the population were below the poverty line, including 10.2% of those under age 18 and 8.2% of those age 65 or over.

Economy

Pepperidge Farm, Xerox, Frontier Communications, and Booking Holdings have headquarters in Norwalk.

Arts and culture

Events
 St. George Greek Orthodox Festival, held in late August, features Greek delicacies, Pontic Greek dance exhibitions, and a large carnival.
 Round Hill Highland Games, a festival of Scottish culture and athletic events, was started in 1923 in Greenwich, but was interrupted during World War II, then restarted in 1952. It has been held in Norwalk's Cranbury Park on or around July 4 for a number of years. In 2006, the 83rd annual event attracted 4,000 people to hear bagpipes and watch the caber toss, the hammer throw, and other events, with athletes often wearing wool kilts. Games for children are offered. Food and Scottish items are available for sale. Organizers say the event is the third-oldest Scottish-games festival in the United States.

Places of worship
 Beth Israel Synagogue
 Saint Jerome Church
 Saint Joseph Church
 Saint Ladislaus Church
 Saint Mary Church
 Saint Matthew Church
 St. Philip Church
 Saint Thomas the Apostle Church
 Parkway Assembly of God (Norwalk Connecticut) New Canaan Avenue

Attractions

 Norwalk Oyster Festival
 Norwalk Boat Show
 Lockwood-Mathews Mansion Museum
 Maritime Aquarium at Norwalk
 The Mill Hill Historic Park and Museum
 Norwalk Film Festival
 Norwalk Historical Society Museum
 Norwalk Islands
 Norwalk Symphony Orchestra
 Norwalk Youth Symphony
 Sheffield Island Light (house)
 SoNo Switchtower Museum
 Stepping Stones Museum for Children

Notable places on the National Register of Historic Places

 Norwalk Green Historic District
 Joseph Loth Company Building
 Lockwood-Mathews Mansion
 Rock Ledge
 Norwalk's Former City Hall
 Sheffield Island Light
 Peck Ledge Lighthouse
 Greens Ledge Light
 Beth Israel Synagogue
 Village Creek
 White Barn Theatre

Government

Politics

Norwalk has voted Democratic for president since 1992, when the city voted for Bill Clinton. However, between 1928 and 1992, the city only voted Democratic twice: 1936 and 1964.

Districts
The City of Norwalk currently has six taxing districts. The First, Second, Third, and Sixth taxing districts are political entities with their respective voters electing officers, holding annual business meetings, approving budgets, and considering other matters, as specified in each of their charters. Election of Taxing District Commissioners and Treasurers by voters from the 1st, 2nd, 3rd, and 6th districts take place in odd-numbered years.

The Fourth and Fifth districts are not counted as separate governments, as they constitute the city proper. Each taxing district has its own property tax rate reflecting the mix of services each receives from the city.
Secondly, municipal elections of mayor, common council, board of education, and other positions are also held in odd-numbered years at 13 polling places within five voting districts around the city.

Voting districts are not the same for state and federal elections, which are held on even-numbered years at 12 polling locations.

Municipal

Norwalk's municipal government is a weak-mayor form of a mayor-council government with the mayor of Norwalk elected by its voters.  The city's charter gives certain administrative powers exclusively to the council and others jointly to the Council and Mayor. The Common Council is the law-writing body of the City of Norwalk.  Norwalk's common council consists of fifteen council members, five elected at-large and ten elected by district, two from each district.

Representatives

Norwalk is represented in the Connecticut General Assembly by five House eepresentatives corresponding to five Connecticut legislative districts and one senator from one Connecticut Senate district.

Norwalk, which lies within Connecticut's 4th congressional district, is represented in the United States Congress by one congressional representative (Democrat Jim Himes) in the United States House of Representatives, and along with the rest of Connecticut, by two U.S. Senators (Democrats Richard Blumenthal and Chris Murphy) in the United States Senate.

Education

Norwalk Public Schools operates public schools, while the community also has various private schools.

Norwalk was granted a town charter by the Connecticut General Court in 1651. On May 29, 1678, town records mention the establishment of community-supported teaching activities with a passage that reads:
"'At a town meeting... voted and agreed to hier a scole master to teach all the children in ye town to lerne to Rede and write; and that Mr. Cornish shall be hierd for that service and the townsmen are to hier him upon as reasonable terms as they can."

The school that was established in the 1670s was located near the Ludlow Square area of East Norwalk (near the former Roger Ludlow Junior High School).

Sports
Baseball and softball are popular amateur sports with active leagues across many age groups in Norwalk. Four baseball fields and 16 Little League fields are in the city.  Several of the fields, including Calf Pasture Beach, are illuminated for nighttime play. The fields at the Norwalk Little League team won the Little League World Series in 1952.
The 14-year-old Babe Ruth League team won the championship in 2008.
In 2010, the 12-year-old Norwalk all-star team made it to the Cal Ripken League World Series and placed third in the country.  In 2011, the Norwalk Senior American Legion baseball team won the Connecticut state championship. This had not been accomplished by any other Norwalk Legion team in the storied 83-year history. The team defeated Branford, Connecticut, in the championship game. The girls' Norwalk Pride fast-pitch softball team won the Connecticut state championship in 2005, 2006, and 2007.

The Norwalk Biddy Basketball All-Star team Won the state and regional titles and then went on to the world championships in New Orleans, Louisiana, in 1986 and placed seventh in the world.

Being a coastal city, Norwalk is home to a great many water sports, including competitive swimming, recreational boating and fishing, sailing, windsurfing, and kayaking. The Norwalk River and inner Norwalk Harbor host rowing events and organizations.

Norwalk resident Daniel Walsh won a bronze medal in Beijing
with the U.S. Olympic rowing team in the 2008 Summer Olympics.

Three golf courses are in the city of Norwalk: Shorehaven Golf Club is a private club in East Norwalk, the Silvermine Golf Club is a private club in Silvermine (part of the course lies in the town of Wilton), and the Oak Hills Park golf course is a public course in West Norwalk.

The cross-town rivalry between the city's two largest high schools, Norwalk High School and Brien McMahon High School, is fierce, particularly for the football, basketball, soccer, and field hockey teams in the fall, as well as lacrosse, baseball, and softball teams in the spring. Brien McMahon High School's football team won the Fairfield County Interscholastic Athletic Conference and Class M State Football championship in 1994. McMahon High School's boys' lacrosse team won the state division 2 lacrosse championship in 2000.

Norwalk was once the home of the Connecticut Wildcats, part of the American National Rugby League, from 2003 to 2015.

Media
News sources in Norwalk include News 12 Connecticut, a regional news channel for southwestern Connecticut and based in Norwalk. The Hour was an independent daily newspaper based in Norwalk and founded in 1871, which was purchased by Hearst Communications on April 12, 2016.  NancyonNorwalk.com is a self-published, nonprofit news site founded in 2010 that covers local issues.

Transportation

Highways
Interstate 95 and the Merritt Parkway lead through Norwalk, with several exits within the Norwalk city limits, and are the major thoroughfare through the city. U.S. Route 1 goes through the center of the city, mostly following local streets. The major north–south corridor in Norwalk is U.S. Route 7, which is an expressway throughout most of the route in the city. The expressway section ends at Grist Mill Road in Norwalk from where Route 7 resumes northbound along Main Ave.  Other state routes include Routes 53, 123, and 136.

Buses

Public transport bus service within Norwalk is provided by Norwalk Transit District.  Norwalk Transit District operates fixed-route public bus service in Norwalk and Westport with evening and Sunday shuttles (serving South Norwalk, Main Avenue, and Connecticut Avenue) and commuter shuttles.  Access to other cities through bus services Milford, Danbury, and Stamford. All fixed-route buses meet at the Transportation Hub.

Railroad

The Metro-North Railroad's New Haven Line runs through and stops in Norwalk. The train goes west and east, with Grand Central Terminal and New Haven Union Station being the final stops. The Danbury Branch runs from South Norwalk to Danbury, CT. Four stations are in Norwalk, three of them on the main line which is: Rowayton, South Norwalk and East Norwalk. The fourth station, Merritt 7, is on the Danbury Branch. Metro-North provides commuter service for all four stations.

The structure at 47 Wall Street was formerly the Wall Street station of the Danbury Branch, which operated from 1896 to 1936. The city's trolley system barn also operated on Wall Street.

Airports
Norwalk is within reasonable distance of 11 airports - four general aviation, two regional, and five international.

Infrastructure

Utilities
Electric power and natural gas in most of Norwalk are provided by Eversource Energy.
 The First Taxing District provides water to the Third, Fourth and Fifth Taxing Districts.
 The Second Taxing District serves sections of South Norwalk, East Norwalk, West Norwalk, Rowayton and Silvermine. and also owns and operates South Norwalk Electric and Water.
 The Third Taxing District provides electric power for East Norwalk.
The districts purchase wholesale power and arrange for its delivery to, and distribution within, their respective districts.  Power lines and meters in East Norwalk, South Norwalk, and parts of Rowayton are maintained by the districts. Both the second (SNEW) and third (TTD) district electric departments belong to the six member Connecticut Municipal Electric Energy Cooperative which pools their wholesale power purchasing to obtain lower rates for their customers.

Connecticut Light and Power (now Eversource Energy) operated a power plant, Norwalk Harbor Station on Manresa Island, from 1960 to 1999 when it was acquired by NRG Energy, which then began its deactivation in 2013.

In 2004 the Third Taxing District installed 3 diesel powered generators at the Norden complex on Norden Place that were initially licensed only for emergency power supply. By summer 2008 the generators, with a combined capacity of 6 Megawatts, had been upgraded to allow licensed operation as regular power providers for the grid (not just emergency power).

In 2007 and 2008 the construction of the Middletown-Norwalk transmission line disrupted traffic along the Boston Post Road, but the completion of the line is hoped to help provide additional power to lower Fairfield County.  In addition a high-voltage undersea line runs from Manressa Island to Long Island to help provide electric power to Long Island Power Authority customers.  In 2008 the city government of Norwalk started initial investigations of whether the city might resume generating power for sale to electricity customers in the city.

Emergency services

Norwalk Police Department serves as the city's police department, and Norwalk Fire Department serves Norwalk's fire protection district. Norwalk is served 24/7 by Norwalk Hospital and Norwalk Hospital EMS, a 911 paramedic service. The service consists of hospital-based paramedics and EMT-Is who serve Norwalk as well as New Canaan, Wilton, Weston, and Westport.

Notable people

In popular culture
 In J. D. Salinger's novel The Catcher in the Rye, Holden Caulfield's parents are attending a party in Norwalk the night he sneaks into his apartment to visit his sister, Phoebe.
 In Jonathan Franzen's novel The Corrections, Chip Lambert holds a "twelve-hour vigil" at a Dunkin' Donuts in Norwalk (stalking Melissa Paquette in neighboring Westport).

Films
Full-length features and documentary films, filmed or set in Norwalk:

 Hope Springs (2012)
 Confessions of a Shopaholic (2009) — filmed along Washington Street in SoNo
 Birds of America (2008)
 College Road Trip (2008) — scenes filmed in town in mid-July 2007; shooting locations were the former Norwalk police headquarters building in Matthews Park, on the Merritt Parkway and along the Route 7 connector.
 Revolutionary Road (2008)
 The Six Wives of Henry LeFay (2008) — filmed in 2007 on Wall Street in Norwalk Center
 The Life Before Her Eyes (2007) — Uma Thurman filmed a scene at Norwalk Community College in August 2006.
 Satan's Little Helper (2004)
 The Stepford Wives (2004)
 The Object of My Affection (1998)
 The Stepford Wives (1975)

Television
Partially or entirely recorded in Norwalk:
 Oprah Winfrey Presents: Mitch Albom's For One More Day
House of Dark Shadows (1970 series) — "Abandoned Monastery" portions filmed at the Lockwood-Mathews Mansion

Sister cities 
Nagarote, Nicaragua (1986) (see Norwalk/Nagarote Sister City Project)
Riobamba, Ecuador (2018)

References

External links

 
Cities in Connecticut
Neighborhoods in Connecticut
Connecticut placenames of Native American origin
Populated places established in 1651
Cities in the New York metropolitan area
Cities in Fairfield County, Connecticut
Populated coastal places in Connecticut
1651 establishments in Connecticut